INS Yaffo has been borne by at least two ships of the Israeli Sea Corps:

 , the former British Z-class destroyer HMS Zodiac acquired in 1955 and stricken in 1972
 , a  commissioned in 1998

Israeli Navy ship names